Servaea murina is the only species of the jumping spider genus Servaea found outside of Australia. It is endemic to Java.

Description
The species is described from the female only, which is  about 8 mm long. The carapace is longish and mainly black, with a silky yellow pubescence and some long black hairs. The flattish broad oval abdomen is brownish with variable dark marks and a silky yellow pubescence. The first pair of legs is dark brown, the others are yellow with dark rings. All show the same yellow pubescence and long hairs.

Name
The species name murina is derived from Latin mus "mouse".

Footnotes

References
  (2000): An Introduction to the Spiders of South East Asia. Malaysian Nature Society, Kuala Lumpur.
  (2007): The world spider catalog, version 8.0. American Museum of Natural History.

External links
 Description of S. murina

Salticidae
Fauna of Java
Spiders of Asia
Spiders described in 1902